King Stephen, Op. 117 (König Stephan) is a commemorative work composed by Ludwig van Beethoven in 1811. It includes an overture in E flat major and nine vocal numbers. Only the overture is usually played today. The title refers to King Stephen I, founder of the Kingdom of Hungary in the year 1000.

In 1808 Emperor Francis I of Austria commissioned the construction of a large theatre at Pest, to alleviate the nationalist feelings incipient in Hungary and to celebrate the loyalty of Hungary to the Austrian Habsburg monarchy. At the time of the inauguration of this theatre in 1811. It was first performed on Feb. 9, 1812. to put to music two commemorative texts written by August von Kotzebue: König Stephan (King Stephen) and Die Ruinen von Athen (The Ruins of Athens).

Movements 

Overture (Andante con moto - Presto, E-flat major)
Male chorus: Ruhend von seinen Thaten (Andante maestoso e con moto, C major)
Male chorus: Auf dunkelm in finstern Hainen Wandelten (Allegro con brio - C minor)
Victory march (Feurig und stolz - G major)
Female chorus: Wo die Unschuld Blumen streute (Andante con moto all'Ongarese - A major)
Melodrama (Stéphan): Du hast dein Vaterland
Chorus: Eine neue strahlende Sonne (Vivace - F major)
<li>Melodrama (Stéphan): Ihr edlen Ungarn! (Maestoso con moto - D major)
a. Religious March (Moderato - B-flat major)
b. Melodrama with chorus: Heil unserm Konige! (Allegro vivace e con brio - B-flat major)
Final chorus: Heil! Heil unserm Enkeln (Presto - D major)

References 
Lecompte Michel, Guide illustré de la musique symphonique de Beethoven, Fayard, 1995, 335p. 
 Catalogue Beethoven (Opus)

External links 
 

Overtures
Incidental music
Compositions by Ludwig van Beethoven
1811 compositions
Compositions in E-flat major